Mettle is the second and final release from art rock band Hugo Largo.  It was released by Brian Eno's record label, Opal, on January 1, 1989 and was supported by a European tour following its release. Mettle was produced by then-member and current electronic musician Hahn Rowe.

Track listing

Personnel
Hugo Largo
Adam Peacock
Hahn Rowe
Mimi Goese
Tim Sommer

Notes 
This was Hugo Largo's last album before their initial breakup, although a later 1990-91 lineup wrote and recorded new material for a third, never-released album.

References 

1989 albums
All Saints Records albums